Circle X Ranch is a park unit located in the Triunfo Pass within the southwestern Santa Monica Mountains National Recreation Area, in Ventura County, California.  It is located in the western Santa Monica Mountains.

Sandstone Peak, the highest peak in the range, and Boney Peak, are in the park with trails to their summits. Views can include the Channel Islands, Mount Baldy, and the Topatopa Mountains.

The park was formerly Camp Circle X, a Boy Scout camp. The northeast section is adjacent to the Boney Mountain Wilderness in Point Mugu State Park.

Recreation

The park's Sandstone Peak Trail, Mishe Mokwa Trail, and others lead to high mountain vistas, riparian canyons with streams, and through chaparral and oak woodland habitats. The park is locally popular for The Grotto, a naturally 'enclosed' waterfall and wading pool.

Facilities include a ranch house with the Circle X Ranger Station, and a group campground, and many trailheads.

See also
California coastal sage and chaparral ecoregion
Coastal sage scrub
California montane chaparral and woodlands ecoregion
California oak woodlands

References

External links

Santa Monica Mountains National Recreation Area
Parks in Ventura County, California
Santa Monica Mountains